Llyn Gwernan is a lake in Gwynedd, Wales and an important geological site, notable for an unusual thickness of Devensian Late-glacial organic deposits.

References

Dolgellau
Gwernan
Gwernan
Sites of Special Scientific Interest in East Gwynedd